Dr. Abdel Hay Mashhour (Arabic:عبدالحي مشهور, born July 1, 1923).
He was President of Tanta University in Egypt from the period September 18, 1978 until July 31, 1983.

He was the president of the Egyptian Orthopaedic Association from 1989 to 1990 and is an honorary fellow of the International College of Surgeons.

Qualifications 

He received his Bachelor of Medicine and Surgery cum laude of Medicine, Cairo 1948.
He received his Diploma of General Surgery, Faculty of Medicine, Cairo University, 1953.
He received his Diploma in Orthopedic Surgery, Faculty of Medicine, Cairo University, 1954.
He received his Master's degree in Orthopedic Surgery, Faculty of Medicine, Cairo University, 1961.

Career 
He joined the Ministry of Health as a doctor February 20, 1966.
and became an Assistant Professor of Orthopedic Surgery, Faculty of Medicine February 21, 1966 Tanta University.
He was promoted to Professor of Orthopedic Surgery, Faculty of Medicine March 28, 1972 Tanta University.
He is now Emeritus Professor of Orthopedic Surgery, Faculty of Medicine with effect from September 31, 1983.

Administrative positions 

He was Head of the Department of Surgery, Faculty of Medicine Tanta starting from March 28, 1972 to November 5, 1977.
He became Dean of the Faculty of Medicine Tanta as of November 6, 1977.
He served as President of Tanta University from the period September 18, 1978 until July 31, 1983.

References

Living people
Egyptian surgeons
Academic staff of Tanta University
Cairo University alumni
Year of birth missing (living people)